Kalmia is a genus of about ten species of evergreen shrubs from 0.2–5 m tall, in the family Ericaceae. They are native to North America (mainly in the eastern half of the continent) and Cuba. They grow in acidic soils, with different species in wet acid bog habitats (K. angustifolia, K. polifolia) and dry, sandy soils (K. ericoides, K. latifolia).

Kalmia was named by Linnaeus to honour his friend the botanist Pehr Kalm, who collected it in eastern North America during the mid-18th century. Earlier, Mark Catesby saw it during his travels in Carolina, and after his return to England in 1726, imported seeds. He described it, a costly rarity, in his Natural History of Carolina, as Chamaedaphne foliis tini, that is to say "with leaves like the Laurustinus"; the botanist and plant-collector Peter Collinson, who had begged some of the shrub from his correspondent John Custis in Virginia, wrote, when his plants flowered, that "I Really Think it exceeds the Laurus Tinus."

The leaves are 2–12 cm long and simple lanceolate. The flowers are white, pink or purple, in corymbs of 10-50, reminiscent of Rhododendron flowers but flatter, with a star-like calyx of five conjoined petals; each flower is 1–3 cm diameter. The fruit is a five-lobed capsule, which splits to release the numerous small seeds.

The foliage contains grayanotoxins, a group of closely related neurotoxins named after Leucothoe grayana, native to Japan, so it is toxic if eaten, with sheep being particularly prone to poisoning, hence the name lambkill used for some of the species. Other names for Kalmia, particularly Kalmia angustifolia, are sheep-laurel, lamb-kill, calf-kill, kill-kid, and sheep-poison, which may be written with or without the hyphen. (See species list below.) "Kid" here refers to a young goat, not a human child, but the foliage and twigs are toxic to humans as well.

It has also been called spoonwood because Kalm was told by Dutch settlers of North America that Native Americans made spoons from the wood. Given its toxicity, this may be folklore rather than scientific fact.

Kalmias are popular garden shrubs, grown for their decorative flowers. They should not be planted where they are accessible to livestock due to the toxicity.

Kalmia species are used as food plants by the larvae of some lepidopteran species including Coleophora kalmiella which feeds exclusively on Kalmia.

Species
 
Species (and infraspecific taxa) listed by The Plant List as "Accepted":
 Kalmia angustifolia L. - Sheep-laurel, lambkill 
 Kalmia buxifolia (Bergius) Gift & Kron - Sandmyrtle
 Kalmia carolina Small - Carolina mountain-laurel  
 Kalmia cuneata Michx. - Whitewicky  
 Kalmia ericoides C.Wright ex Griseb. - Cuban kalmia
 Kalmia ericoides var. aggregata (Small) Ebinger   
 Kalmia hirsuta Walter - Hairy mountain-laurel  
 Kalmia latifolia L. - Lambkill  
 Kalmia latifolia f. alba (Mouill.) Rehder   
 Kalmia latifolia f. fuscata (Rehder) Rehder   
 Kalmia latifolia f. obtusata (Rehder) Rehder   
 Kalmia latifolia f. polypetala (G.Nicholson) Rehder   
 Kalmia microphylla (Hook.) A.Heller - Alpine laurel, alpine bog-laurel, alpine mountain-laurel 
 Kalmia microphylla subsp. occidentalis (Small) Roy L.Taylor & MacBryde
 Kalmia polifolia Wangenh. - Bog kalmia, bog-laurel  
 Kalmia simulata (Britton & M.Wilson) Southall

Kalmia procumbens is a widely accepted member of this genus, though it is the only species in the genus Loiseleuria according to The Plant List. The related Kalmiopsis (Kalmiopsis leachiana and K. fragrans) is a rare shrub endemic to southwest Oregon.

Fossil record
Fossil leaves of †Kalmia saxonica have been described from the Lower Miocene of Brandis, Germany and Bełchatów, Poland, †'Kalmia marcodurensis have been described from the Lower Miocene of Bitterfeld, Germany. In the Late Tertiary Kalmia was associated with coal-forming vegetation occurring as a component of the vegetation of bush swamps together with Cyrilla and other shrubs. Among recent species Kalmia angustifolia is most similar to †Kalmia saxonica in respect of morphology, while Kalmia latifolia has a very similar epidermal structure. These two extant species grow in the eastern part of North America from (Quebec to Florida) on acid swampy or marshy soils.

Bibliography

Books 
 Jaynes, Richard A., 1997: Kalmia, mountain laurel and related species, Timber Press, Portland, Oregon, U.S.A.

 Huebbers, Karl-Heinz and Westhoff, Julia,2020 : Fascynujące kalmie (Fascinating Kalmie) published by Plantin, Krakow, Poland 
ISBN: 978-83-956964-0-4

References

External links 
European Kalmia Society
Kalmia.info: German Kalmia hybridizers
Pieris.eu: Info about Kalmia latifolia

 
Ericaceae genera
Taxa named by Carl Linnaeus